Ritual is a 2012 Indonesian psychological thriller film written and directed by Joko Anwar. It stars Rio Dewanto in the lead role and is Anwar's first English-language film. According to Anwar, he made the film in English simply to indicate that it does not take place in Indonesia.

Synopsis 
The film opens with a man (Rio Dewanto) waking up buried in a shallow grave in the middle of a forest with no recollection of what happened to him. He finds hints that he has a family and therefore travels the jungle trying to reunite with his wife and children. However, he soon finds out that he is not alone and there is someone trying to kill him and his family.

Cast 
 Rio Dewanto as John Evans
 Hannah Al Rashid as Woman
 Izzi Isman as Girl
 Aridh Tritama as Boy
 Sadha Triyudha as Older Son
 Jose Gamo as Younger Son
 Marsha Timothy as Wife
 Surya Saputra as Husband

Production

Development 
Anwar has stated that he first conceived the idea for the film in 2006. According to producer Sheila Timothy, Anwar first shared the story with her in 2009 while making The Forbidden Door, which she also produced through Lifelike Pictures.

Filming 
Shooting took place in Mount Pancar in Sentul, West Java, across 10 days in November 2011.

Release 
Ritual was released in theaters in Indonesia on 26 April 2012. It was also selected for screening at the 2012 South by Southwest in Austin, Texas, United States.

Reception 
The film received mixed reviews upon release. Anton Bitel of Little White Lies gave Ritual a positive review, calling the narrative "disorienting" with an ending that "makes all the disparate elements in the film cohere in an ingenious, unsettling manner". In a lukewarm review, Cornila Desyana of Tempo called the film "absurd" and criticized the lack of dialogues even for the lead character.

John Townsend of Starburst panned the film, saying "Instead of what could have been a taut, tense thriller, Ritual descends into a weary chase movie where you never really care who is chasing whom, or why.

Awards and nominations

References

External links

2012 films
Indonesian horror films
English-language Indonesian films
2010s English-language films
Films directed by Joko Anwar